The Politburo of the Communist Party of Vietnam (CPV), formally the Political Bureau of the Central Committee of the Communist Party of Vietnam (Vietnamese: Bộ Chính trị Ban Chấp hành trung ương Đảng Cộng sản Việt Nam Khoá), is the highest body of the CPV in between gatherings of the National Congress and of the plenary sessions Central Committee. According to Party rules, the Politburo directs the general orientation of the government.

The members of the Politburo are elected and given a ranking by the Central Committee in the immediate aftermath of a National Party Congress. The current Politburo (13th term) was elected by the 1st Plenary Session of the 13th Central Committee in the aftermath of the 13th National Congress and consists of 18 members. The first-ranked member is General Secretary of the Central Committee.

Duties and responsibilities
The Politburo is a subunit of the Central Committee, the supreme organ on party affairs. The members of the Central Committee, when the Party Congress has ended, freely elects the composition of the Politburo. The number of Politburo members is also decided by the Central Committee membership. Until 1990, there were two different forms of Politburo membership: full and alternate. When the Secretariat was abolished in 1996, a short-lived Politburo Standing Committee (also known as the Politburo Standing Board) was established. Unlike the Secretariat, the Politburo Standing Committee was appointed by the Politburo and not the Central Committee (although the two bodies had nearly-identical functions). The Politburo Standing Committee was abolished in 2001 at the 9th National Congress, and the Secretariat was reestablished. Elected members are given rankings in an order of precedence.

The Politburo is the leading organ on Party affairs; the Central Committee convenes only twice a year, but the Politburo can implement policies which has been approved by either the previous Party Congress or the Central Committee. It is the duty of the Politburo to ensure that resolutions of the Party Congress and the Central Committee are implemented nationally. It is also responsible for matters related to organisation and personnel, and has the right to prepare (and even convene) a Central Committee plenary session. The Politburo can be overruled by the Central Committee, as happened in 2001 when the Politburo voted in favour of retaining Lê Khả Phiêu as General Secretary; the Central Committee responded by overturning the Politburo decision, dismissed Lê from active politics altogether, and forced the Central Committee to elect a new General Secretary after the 9th National Congress.

Meetings are held regularly; decisions within the Politburo are made through collective decision-making, which means that policies are only enacted if a majority of Politburo members support them. In the 1960s, outside analysts believed the Politburo was divided into two factions (pro-China and pro-Soviet); this forced Politburo members to decide policy through compromise. This was later proven wrong, because Hồ Chí Minh became a staunch believer in collective decision-making during the 1950s after the beginning of de-Stalinisation in the Soviet Union. Hồ's successor, Lê Duẩn, stated at the 4th National Congress that "Only with collective decisions made by collective intelligence will we be able to avoid subjectivism that leads to errors and sometimes to dangerous consequences". Hồ's emphasis on the maintenance of unity led the Party to eschew the Communist Party of China's (CPC) policy of "criticism and self-criticism". The CPC's criticism and self-criticism policy was used to resolve "internal contradictions"; the problem with this concept was that it always assumed that one side was right. "Criticism and self-criticism" was not introduced in Vietnam, chiefly for this reason.

However, Zachary Abuza (author of Renovating Politics in Contemporary Vietnam) claims that Politburo decision-making is built on factional infighting and ideological differences rather than on any notion of collective leadership. The Politburo is responsible to the Central Committee, and the Central Committee can question the Politburo. The composition of the Central Military Commission, the leading Party organ on military affairs, is decided by the Politburo. It is the responsibility of the Secretariat (not the Politburo) to ensure the implementation of directives stemming from the Politburo.

Power in relation to the state
Before the reforms of Nguyễn Văn Linh during the late 1980s, the Politburo was the supreme decision-making organ in all areas of party and state. Before 1988, the Politburo had no clear guideline on its responsibilities on socioeconomic issues. Because of this lack, the Politburo frequently meddled in the affairs of the Council of Ministers (the central government). Until 1988, the Politburo made detailed planning and budgetary decisions; from 1988 onwards, the Politburo decides a plan's general orientation, but lets the central government make detailed socioeconomic decisions. The all-encompassing role of the Politburo before 1988 blurred the roles of the party and state in the decision-making process. Another problem until 1988 was that many members of the Politburo were leading officials within the state (again blurring the roles of party and state).

The Politburo has the unofficial power to appoint members of the central government through the National Assembly of Vietnam. Because the National Assembly is dominated by the party, party leadership has considerable leverage in appointing members of the central government. However, even if the Politburo decides the appointment of officials, party members can oppose the nominees; the appointment of Đỗ Mười was opposed by the Club of Resistance Veterans, a group of reformist communist cadres.

Current members
The current 18-member Politburo was elected on January 31, 2021 at the first plenum of the 13th Party Central Committee. Nguyễn Phú Trọng was re-elected for his third term as General Secretary of the Communist Party of Vietnam, a position he has held since 2011.

References

Citations

Sources 

 
 
 
 

 
 
Government of Vietnam
Lists of political office-holders in Vietnam